Lago Buenos Aires Department is a department in Santa Cruz Province, Argentina. It has a population of 6,223 (2001) and an area of 28,609 km². The seat of the department is in Perito Moreno.

Municipalities
 Los Antiguos
 Perito Moreno

References
Instituto Nacional de Estadísticas y Censos, INDEC

Departments of Santa Cruz Province, Argentina